Malononitrile is an organic compound nitrile with the formula . It is a colorless or white solid, although aged samples appear yellow or even brown.  It is a widely used building block in organic synthesis.

Preparation and reactions
It can be prepared by dehydration of cyanoacetamide.  This method is mainly practiced in China where environmental rules are lax.  Most commonly malononitrile is produced by the gas-phase reaction of acetonitrile and cyanogen chloride:

About 20,000,000 kg are produced annually (2007).  Important outlets include the synthesis of thiamine, the drug triamterene and minoxidil, and the dyes disperse Yellow 90 and disperse Blue 354.

Malononitrile is relatively acidic, with a pKa of 11 in water. This allows it to be used in the Knoevenagel condensation, for example in the preparation of CS gas:

Malononitrile is a suitable starting material for the Gewald reaction, where the nitrile condenses with a ketone or aldehyde in the presence of elemental sulfur and a base to produce a 2-aminothiophene.

See also
 Malonic acid
 Diethyl malonate

References

External links
 WebBook page for C3H2N2
 CDC - NIOSH Pocket Guide to Chemical Hazards

Alkanedinitriles